Steven Johnson may refer to:

Sports 
 Steven Johnson (American football) (born 1988), American linebacker in the National Football League
 Steven Johnson (racing driver) (born 1974), Australian V8 Supercar racing driver
 Steven Johnson (field hockey) (1929-2009), British Olympic hockey player

Politics 
 Steven C. Johnson (Kansas politician), American politician and member of the Kansas House of Representatives
 Steven C. Johnson (Maryland politician), American politician and member of the Maryland House of Delegates
 Steve Johnson (Michigan politician), American politician and member of the Michigan House of Representatives

Other 
 Steven Johnson (author) (born 1968), American popular science author
 Steven Johnson, drummer for Alabama Shakes
 Steven G. Johnson, American mathematician

See also 
 Steve Johnson (disambiguation)
 Stephen Johnson (disambiguation)
 Stevens–Johnson syndrome, a type of severe skin reaction